Charles Pogue may refer to:

 Charles Nelson Pogue (1897–1985), Canadian mechanic and inventor
 Charles Edward Pogue (born 1950), American screenwriter, playwright and stage actor